Welcome is a census-designated place (CDP) in Davidson County, North Carolina, United States. The population was 4,162 at the 2010 census. It is nationally known as the home of Richard Childress Racing.
In addition, Walker and Associates, Inc., a nationwide communication value-add distribution is headquartered here. The town motto is "Welcome to Welcome, A Friendly Place," as posted on the welcoming sign. Neighboring communities and municipalities include Midway, Arcadia, and Lexington.

History
Beulah Church of Christ Cemetery, Good Hope Methodist Church Cemetery, and Waggoner Graveyard are listed on the National Register of Historic Places.

Geography
Welcome is located at  (35.904822, -80.252481).

Demographics

2020 census

As of the 2020 United States census, there were 4,131 people, 1,612 households, and 1,095 families residing in the CDP.

2000 census
As of the census of 2000, there were 3,538 people, 1,437 households, and 1,092 families living in the CDP. The population density was 378.4 people per square mile (146.1/km). There were 1,514 housing units at an average density of 161.9 per square mile (62.5/km). The racial makeup of the CDP was 95.31% White, 2.66% African American, 0.08% Native American, 0.79% Asian, 0.37% from other races, and 0.79% from two or more races. Hispanic or Latino of any race were 0.65% of the population.

There were 1,437 households, out of which 31.3% had children under the age of 18 living with them, 64.2% were married couples living together, 8.1% had a female householder with no husband present, and 24.0% were non-families. 20.7% of all households were made up of individuals, and 7.8% had someone living alone who was 65 years of age or older. The average household size was 2.46 and the average family size was 2.84.

In the CDP, the population was spread out, with 22.6% under the age of 18, 7.3% from 18 to 24, 31.6% from 25 to 44, 24.9% from 45 to 64, and 13.6% who were 65 years of age or older. The median age was 38 years. For every 100 females, there were 97.7 males. For every 100 females age 18 and over, there were 95.5 males.

The median income for a household in the CDP was $42,266, and the median income for a family was $51,810. Males had a median income of $32,183 versus $26,495 for females. The per capita income for the CDP was $22,613. About 3.8% of families and 5.0% of the population were below the poverty line, including 7.5% of those under age 18 and 8.3% of those age 65 or over.

Education
Welcome is home to North Davidson High School as well as North Davidson Middle School and Welcome Elementary School.

Media

Welcome is home to WUNW-FM, a radio station broadcasting at 91.1 FM.  It serves as a low-power repeater for WUNC, a public radio station broadcasting National Public Radio content.

Notable people
Austin Dillon, NASCAR driver
Ty Dillon, NASCAR driver

References

Census-designated places in Davidson County, North Carolina
Census-designated places in North Carolina